Jagat Singh I (1607 – 10 April 1652), was the Maharana of Mewar Kingdom in Rajputana, India (r. 1628–1652). He was a son of Maharana Karan Singh II. 
Jagat Singh built a wall around the Chittor Fort. When Shahjahan heard of it, he sent his noble wajir Sadullah Khan to invade Mewar because Shahjahan thought that Jagat Singh broke the treaty that his father made with Amar Singh. The treaty had a clause that any Rana of Mewar cannot build any defence or safe wall around the fort. The Rana sent his messengers when Sadullah Khan reached the borders of Mewar, the misunderstanding was soon resolved and the Mughals turned back. Rana Jagat Singh Made a new treaty with Shahjahan and demolished the wall that he built around the fort.

References

Mewar dynasty
1607 births
1652 deaths